The Jardin des plantes de La Rochelle is a small botanical garden located behind the natural history museum at 28 rue Albert Ier, La Rochelle, Charente-Maritime, Nouvelle-Aquitaine, France. It is open daily without charge.

The garden was formerly owned by the Jesuits. In 1808 it became a municipal botanical garden as extension of the former Hôtel Jouin de la Tremblaye, but was quickly turned into a park. A new botanical garden has recently been established on the site, which now contains a collection of local plants, as well as species from China, North Africa, and North America.

See also 
 List of botanical gardens in France

References 
 Jardin des plantes de La Rochelle
 French-Gardens entry
 Je Decouvre La France entry (French)
 Conservatoire des Jardins et Paysages entry (French)

Rochelle, Jardin des plantes de La
Rochelle, Jardin des plantes de La
Tourist attractions in La Rochelle